Francisco Moreira (29 April 1915 – 2 November 1991) was a Portuguese footballer who played as a midfielder.

Career
Moreira gained 7 caps and scored 1 goal for Portugal, and made his debut 6 May 1945 in A Coruña against Spain in a 2–4 defeat.

Honours
Benfica
 Primeira Divisão (2)
 Taça de Portugal (4)
 Latin Cup: 1950

References

External links 
 
 

1915 births
1991 deaths
Portuguese footballers
Association football midfielders
Primeira Liga players
S.L. Benfica footballers
Portugal international footballers
Place of birth missing
Place of death missing